Big Sandy Independent School District may refer to:

 Big Sandy Independent School District (Polk County, Texas)
 Big Sandy Independent School District (Upshur County, Texas)